The city of Athens, capital of modern Greece, has had different sets of city walls from the Bronze Age to the early 19th century. The city walls of Athens include:
 the Mycenaean Cyclopean fortifications of the Acropolis of Athens
 the Pelasgic wall at the foot of the Acropolis
 the so-called "Archaic Wall", whose existence and course are debated by scholars
 the Themistoclean Wall, built in 479 BC, the main city wall during Antiquity, restored and rebuilt several times (under Conon, Demosthenes, Demetrios Poliorketes, etc.)
 the Long Walls, built in the 460s and 440s BC, connecting Athens with its ports at Piraeus and Phaleron
 the Protocheisma, a second wall built in front of the Themistoclean Wall in 338 BC as an extra defence against the Macedonians 
 the Diateichisma, built in the 280s BC as a second line of defence against Macedonian-held Piraeus
 the Rizokastro, built in the 11th/12th century around the Acropolis
 the Wall of Haseki, constructed in 1778 by the Ottoman governor of Athens, Hadji Ali Haseki

References

Sources